A municipal authority is a form of special-purpose governmental unit in Pennsylvania. The municipal authority is an alternate vehicle for accomplishing public purposes without the direct action of counties, municipalities and school districts. These purposes commonly include the acquisition, financing, construction and operation of projects such as water supply and sewer systems, airports, transit systems, parking garages, flood control systems, parks, and similar entities. An authority may fix and collect rentals or other charges and may issue revenue bonds. A board appointed by the establishing government or governments governs each authority.

A municipal authority may be said to be an independent corporate agent of the Commonwealth of Pennsylvania, exercising governmental, as well as private corporate power, in assisting the Commonwealth in meeting the needs of its citizens. Most, but not all, municipal authorities operate under Pennsylvania's Municipality Authorities Act.

Reasons for establishing municipal authorities
Common reasons for establishing municipal authorities include financing a project without tapping the general taxing or borrowing power of a municipality, facilitating the cooperative involvement of several municipalities in a project, and distancing the operation of a project from the political considerations inherent in direct municipal operation.

All these reasons were involved, for example, when the Northland Public Library Authority was established to enable several municipalities to jointly own and operate a public library. The authority acquired the land for a new library, borrowed the construction money, built the building, and now operates the library. Absent the municipal authority, matters of joint ownership, joint financing, and joint operational control could be so thorny as to prevent the library's development in the first place, let alone allowing it to operate in an effective and businesslike manner.

Census of municipal authorities
In its 2002 Census of Governments, the U.S. Census Bureau listed 1,885 municipal authorities in Pennsylvania. Prominent among them are the Allegheny County Airport Authority, which operates Pittsburgh International Airport and Allegheny County Airport, large sewer authorities in Allegheny and Delaware counties, and parking authorities in Philadelphia and Pittsburgh. There are also important parking authorities in Allentown, Bethlehem, Erie, Harrisburg, Lancaster, Reading and Scranton. Some authorities, such as the public transportation authorities in Philadelphia and Pittsburgh, operate under special legislation rather than the Municipality Authorities Act.

See also
Off-budget enterprise
Public benefit corporation
Pennsylvania Intergovernmental Cooperation Authority
Pittsburgh Intergovernmental Cooperation Authority
Port Authority of Allegheny County
Southeastern Pennsylvania Transportation Authority (SEPTA)
Allegheny County Sanitary Authority

Sources 
Municipal Authorities in Pennsylvania (PDF download of a 92-page handbook)
Pennsylvania Legislators' Municipal Deskbook - Municipal Authorities
Pennsylvania Municipality Authorities Act 53 Pa.C.S. § 5601 et seq.
Pennsylvania Municipal Authorities Association
U.S. Census Bureau 2002 Census of Governments
 The Pennsylvania Department of Community and Economic Development has a page Municipal Authorities General Information which has three databases containing information about Pennsylvania municipal authorities.

External links
These links provide insight into various types of municipal authority:
Delaware County Regional Water Quality Control Authority  (Large wastewater management authority)
List of Municipal Authorities in Allegheny County (100 Authorities with great diversity in size and function. Examples appear below.)
Pittsburgh Parking Authority (Large parking authority)
West View Water Authority (Medium-sized water supply authority)
McCandless Township Sanitary Authority (Small sewer authority)
Moon Township: Transportation Authority and Industrial Development Authority (Small ones)
Ross-West View EMS Ambulance Authority (Multi-municipal ambulance authority)
Avonworth Municipal Authority (Multi-municipal park authority)

Local government in Pennsylvania